Actibind is an actin-binding fungal T(2)-RNase protein that is produced by the black mold Aspergillus niger, a microorganism used in biotechnology and food technology. In plants, actibind binds actin, a major component of the cytoskeleton, interfering with the plants' pollen tubes and halting cell growth. Research published in the journal Cancer on 15 May 2006 reports evidence that actibind has antiangiogenic and anticarcinogenic characteristics.  In human colon cancer, breast cancer and melanoma, increasing the level of actibind was found to reduce the ability of these cells to form tumorogenic colonies. In animal models, increased actibind inhibited the growth of colon cancer-derived tumors, metastases and blood vessel formation. During the completion of the Human Genome Project, the gene encoding for RNaseT2, the human actibind-like protein, was found on chromosome 6.

References

 

Proteins